Copelatus concolorans is a species of diving beetle. It is part of the genus Copelatus of the subfamily Copelatinae in the family Dytiscidae. It was described by J. Balfour-Browne in 1939.

References

concolorans
Beetles described in 1939